Hussein Onn formed the second Hussein cabinet after being invited by Tuanku Yahya Petra to begin a new government following the 8 July 1978 general election in Malaysia. Prior to the election, Hussein led (as Prime Minister) the first Hussein cabinet, a coalition government that consisted of members of the component parties of Barisan Nasional. It was the 8th cabinet of Malaysia formed since independence.

This is a list of the members of the second cabinet of the third Prime Minister of Malaysia, Hussein Onn.

Composition

Full members
The federal cabinet consisted of the following ministers:

Deputy ministers

Composition before cabinet dissolution

Full members

Deputy ministers

See also
 Members of the Dewan Rakyat, 5th Malaysian Parliament
 List of parliamentary secretaries of Malaysia#Second Hussein cabinet

References

Cabinet of Malaysia
1978 establishments in Malaysia
1981 disestablishments in Malaysia
Cabinets established in 1978
Cabinets disestablished in 1981